The 2016 Marshall Thundering Herd football team represented Marshall University in the 2016 NCAA Division I FBS football season. The Thundering Herd played their home games at the Joan C. Edwards Stadium in Huntington, West Virginia, and competed in the East Division of Conference USA (C–USA). They were led by seventh-year head coach Doc Holliday. They finished the season 3–9, 2–6 in C-USA play to finish in a tie for sixth place in the East Division.

Schedule
Marshall announced its 2016 football schedule on February 4, 2016. The 2016 schedule consists of 7 home and 5 away games in the regular season. The Thundering Herd will host C–USA foes Charlotte, Florida Atlantic, Middle Tennessee, and Western Kentucky (WKU), and will travel to Florida International (FIU), North Texas, Old Dominion, and Southern Miss.

The team played four non–conference games, three home games against Akron from the Mid-American Conference (MAC), Louisville from the Atlantic Coast Conference (ACC), and Morgan State from the Mid-Eastern Athletic Conference, and travel to Pittsburgh from the ACC.

Schedule Source:

Game summaries

Morgan State

Akron

Louisville

Pittsburgh

North Texas

Florida Atlantic

Charlotte

Southern Miss

Old Dominion

Middle Tennessee

Florida International

Western Kentucky

References

Marshall 
Marshall Thundering Herd football seasons
Marshall Thundering Herd football